RecordTV Rio is a Brazilian television station in Rio de Janeiro. It was founded in April 1992, after Múcio Athayde and Nilson Fanini sold TV Rio to Grupo Record. After the sale, Edir Macedo renamed the station to "TV Record Rio de Janeiro". In addition to retransmitting RecordTV's national programming, the station also generates part of RecordTV's programming.

History

First TV Rio
The first TV Rio was on the air between 1955 and 1977. It was broadcast on channel 13 VHF. In the first phase, TV Rio had its own schedule, but exchanged productions with São Paulo's TV Record, of the Machado de Carvalho family (João Batista "Pipa" do Amaral, founder of TV Rio, was the brother-in-law of Paulo Machado de Carvalho). This association was called Emissoras Unidas. In 1967, it was renamed REI (Rede de Emissoras Independentes). Some time later, in 1972, TV Rio leaves REI and joins TV Difusora (Porto Alegre), channel 10. The partnership yielded, at the time, the first color TV broadcast in Brazil, with coverage, in March 1972, from the Festa da Uva, straight from Caxias do Sul (RS).

The artists that had significant roles at the first TV Rio included well-known names such as Chacrinha, Norma Benguell, Moacyr Franco, Dercy Gonçalves, Consuelo Leandro, Ronald Golias, Flávio Cavalcanti and Chico Anysio. TV Rio was a highlight in those days with its comedy programs.

TV Rio produced programs, which are still in the memory of many viewers today. In the 1950s, before the emergence of video tape technology, Família Boaventura and Histórias do Dom Gatão, series that were shown live, had good repercussion. The programs were filmed at an auditorium, with the presence of a live studio audience. In the 60s, the station had a number of successful comedy series: O Riso é o Limite, Teatro Psicodélico and Chico Anysio Show.

The station also aired a number of variety shows, such as Noite de Gala, Espetáculos Tonelux, Show 713 (made with TV Record São Paulo - the name reflected the frequencies of both stations), Rio, cinco pras cinco, Ask João, Show Sem Limites, Rio é Pra Valer and O Domingo é Nosso. He brought from the magazine theater, famous stars, such as Carmem Verônica, Dorinha Duval and Virgínia Lane, who acted in the programs Show Praça Onze and Noites Cariocas, music by João Roberto Kelly.

In 1956, TV Rio added TV Rio Ring to its schedule, with boxing matches that took the station to the first place in the audience on Sundays. The attraction team had as journalist Luiz Mendes, Léo Batista as ring presenter and Téti Alfonso as commentator. The program's success led the competing broadcaster, TV Excelsior, to launch the program "Dois no Ring", on Saturdays, with a narration by Oduvaldo Cozzi, comments by Otávio Name and a presentation by Manuel Espezim Bermuda Neto.

It was also the first television station in Brazil to pay attention to the news, showing successful news programs, such as Correspondente Vemag and Telejornal Pirelli, both directed by Walter Clark and presented by Léo Batista and Heron Domingues, with commentary from Cláudio Melo and Souza (one of the most well-known journalists in the country at the time).

The station had youth shows, such as Hoje é Dia de Rock, Brotos no Treze and Rio Jovem Guarda, presented, among others, by Jair de Taumaturgo and Carlos Imperial. TV Rio received renowned international singers of the time, who performed on special programs. Among them were Rita Pavone, Trini Lopez, Connie Francis, Gigliola Cinquetti, Sergio Endrigo, Brenda Lee, The Platters, Chris Montez, Tom Jones, among others.

Channel 13 also had children's programs. Many of them became famous, such as Clube do Tio Hélio, Clube do Capitão Aventura, A Turma do Zorro, Commander Meteoro and the Pullman Junior Program. The station was the first in Brazil to screen the Japanese series National Kid in 1964. Other prominent series premiered on TV Rio's screen, including The Untouchables, Bat Masterson, The Addams Family, Sea Hunt, James West and The Outer Limits.

At the end of 1964, TV Rio bought broadcast rights in Rio de Janeiro to air the telenovela O Direito de Nascer, produced by TV Tupi in São Paulo, which ended up being one of the biggest hits in Brazilian television audience to date, at the time, in the last chapter, the rate of 99.75% of televisions connected. Due to a large audience, the station hosted the closing party for the soap opera, in August 1965, at Maracanãzinho, which had a direct transmission to São Paulo. On the occasion, César de Alencar and Adalgisa Colombo performed, in addition to the participation of the telenovela's cast. This fact resulted in the dismissal of the management of TV Tupi in Rio de Janeiro, which had rejected the telenovela because it thought it would not have an audience, since it had already been broadcast on radio before.

TV Rio was the first television broadcaster in Brazil to carry out long distance broadcasts, via UHF. In 1957, it broadcast, on October 12, a mass directly from the Basilica of Our Lady of Aparecida, maintaining a sub-station in Guaratinguetá, channel 12, which retransmitted the direct programming of TV Rio. Other sub-stations were created, such as channel 12 in Belo Horizonte (TV Belo Horizonte), channel 5 in Juiz de Fora, channel 8 in Conselheiro Lafayete, channel 2 in Vitória, channel 3 in Nova Friburgo, channel 8 in Barra Mansa, channel 8 in Brasília (TV Alvorada) and channel 8 in Campos dos Goytacazes.

In 1972, the station left Rede de Emissoras Independentes (REI), as it was sold to a group linked to the Order of Capuchins, of the Catholic Church, which owned TV Difusora (channel 10) in Porto Alegre. The new owners tried to implement a line-up based on films, series and cartoons, but the experience did not work, because many of them had already been shown by other broadcasters in the city of Rio de Janeiro.

On April 5, 1977, the station, already in debt, went off the air after having its transmitters sealed for failure to pay the crystal rent to RCA Eletrônica. In 1980, the sister station in Porto Alegre ended up being sold to Rede Bandeirantes.

Second TV Rio
On November 29, 1983, the license of channel 13 is granted to Radiodifusão Ebenézer Ltda., controlled by pastor Nilson Fanini, leader of the First Baptist Church of Niterói, with Cláudio Macário as a partner, in a bid where Editora Abril as well as Rádio Metropolitana, Rádio Capital, Government of the State of Rio de Janeiro and fourteen other companies also competed. The pastor allegedly obtained the concession with the support of federal deputy Arolde de Oliveira, who was a former regional director of the National Telecommunications Department (DENTEL) and a political ally of President João Figueiredo, who had participated in the celebrations of the seventh anniversary of his television program, Reunion (which Nilson Fanini presented at TVE Rio de Janeiro) that year. With the plan to create a new TV Rio, whose idle name was bought and patented, Fanini invests US$6 million (the equivalent of 180 million cruzados) in the import of equipment from Japan and in the renovation of a centenary building of three pavements on the extinct Rua Miguel de Frias, 57, in the neighborhood of Cidade Nova, which would serve as the station's headquarters. The children's wing of the Santa Casa da Misericórdia in Rio de Janeiro had operated there, which had been deactivated since 1975.

Record Rio programs
Balanço Geral RJ Manhã (morning news)
RJ no Ar (morning news)
Balanço Geral RJ (afternoon news)
Cidade Alerta Rio (afternoon news)
RJ Record (night news)
Domingo de Prêmios (Sunday)

RecordTV shows produced and shot by RecordTV Rio 
Dancing Brasil
Apocalipse
Belaventura
Ribeirão do Tempo
Os Dez Mandamentos

External links 
 
 

RecordTV affiliates
Television channels and stations established in 1992
Mass media in Rio de Janeiro (city)